In astrology, the ascendant is the sign ascending on the eastern horizon.

Ascendant may also refer to:

Ascendant (film), cancelled film in the Divergent series
Ascendant (album), by Mark Northfield
"Ascendant", song by Elvin Jones from The Ultimate
"Ascendant", song by Decrepit Birth from Axis Mundi
Their Bright Ascendency, also referred to as Ascendant, a fantasy novel trilogy by K. Arsenault Rivera